Joe Cichy (born May 12, 1948) is a former American football safety.  He was elected to the College Football Hall of Fame in 1997.

1948 births
Living people
Sportspeople from Fargo, North Dakota
American football safeties
North Dakota State Bison football players
College Football Hall of Fame inductees